The British Academy Television Craft Award for Best Scripted Casting is one of the categories presented by the British Academy of Film and Television Arts (BAFTA) within the British Academy Television Craft Awards, the craft awards were established in 2000 with their own, separate ceremony as a way to spotlight technical achievements, without being overshadowed by the main production categories.

First awarded in 2020, according to the BAFTA website, the category is "designed to recognise excellence in casting on scripted work."

Winners and nominees

2020s

See also
 Primetime Emmy Award for Outstanding Casting for a Comedy Series
 Primetime Emmy Award for Outstanding Casting for a Drama Series
 Primetime Emmy Award for Outstanding Casting for a Limited Series, Movie, or Special

References

External links
 

Scripted Casting